The least woolly bat (Kerivoula minuta) is a species of vesper bat in the family Vespertilionidae.
It is found in Malaysia and Thailand.

References

Kerivoulinae
Bats of Southeast Asia
Mammals of Thailand
Taxonomy articles created by Polbot
Taxa named by Gerrit Smith Miller Jr.
Mammals described in 1898